Franzinska "Fränzi" Mägert-Kohli (born 31 May 1982) is a Swiss snowboarder. She won the gold medal in the parallel slalom at the 2009 Snowboarding World Championships.

External links 
 
 
 

1976 births
Living people
People from Thun
Swiss female snowboarders
Olympic snowboarders of Switzerland
Snowboarders at the 2010 Winter Olympics
Sportspeople from the canton of Bern
21st-century Swiss women